Political parties known as Patriotic Alliance include:

Africa 
Patriotic Alliance, a political party in South Africa

Asia 
Bagong Alyansang Makabayan (English: New Patriotic Alliance), an alliance of leftist militant organisations in the Philippines
Democratic Patriotic Alliance of Kurdistan, a former electoral coalition in Iraq
Patriotic Alliance (Burma), a defunct political alliance in Myanmar

Europe 
The Patriotic Alliance, potential new party in the UK
Patriotic Alliance (Greece), a former political party in Greece

North America 
National Alliance for Belizean Rights, formerly known as the Patriotic Alliance for Territorial Integrity, a former political party in Belize
Sint Maarten Patriotic Alliance, a political party in Sint Maarten
Patriotic Alliance (Costa Rica), a political party in Costa Rica

South America 
Honduran Patriotic Alliance, a political party in Honduras
Patriotic Alliance for Change, a former electoral alliance in Paraguay